Buffalo, Ohio may refer to:

 Buffalo, Guernsey County, Ohio
 Buffalo, Jackson County, Ohio